Layne R. Somsen (born June 5, 1989) is currently the starting left fielder for Crow Bar Softball in Sioux Falls, SD. He is a former American professional baseball pitcher. He played in Major League Baseball (MLB) for the Cincinnati Reds in 2016.

Career

Amateur career
Somsen attended Yankton High School and South Dakota State University, where he played college baseball for the South Dakota State Jackrabbits. In his senior season in 2013, Somsen pitched to a 1.87 earned run average and was named the Summit League Pitcher of the Year. Somsen finished his career ranking in the top five in school history in starts (38), innings pitched (215), and strikeouts (180).

Cincinnati Reds
The Cincinnati Reds selected Somsen in the 22nd round of the 2013 MLB draft. He signed with the Reds and made his professional debut with the Billings Mustangs in 2013. A starter in college, Somsen was used as a reliever in the minor leagues. He spent the 2014 season with the Dayton Dragons and the Bakersfield Blaze. He split the 2015 season between the Pensacola Blue Wahoos and the Louisville Bats. After the season, he pitched in the Arizona Fall League for the Peoria Javelinas.

The Reds promoted Somsen to the major leagues after Jay Bruce was placed paternity list with birth of his child on April 25, 2016, but he was sent down on April 28 and did not make his MLB debut during this time on the roster. Somsen was recalled on May 9 and made his MLB debut on May 14, throwing a scoreless inning against the Phillies. Somsen became the third former Jackrabbit to make his debut since 2013, joining fellow relief pitchers Caleb Thielbar and Blake Treinen.

New York Yankees/Los Angeles Dodgers
The Reds waived Somsen, and he was claimed by the New York Yankees on May 24, 2016, who assigned him to the Scranton/Wilkes-Barre RailRiders. On June 13, Somsen was designated for assignment to clear room for Ike Davis on the roster. On June 22, the Los Angeles Dodgers claimed Somsen off waivers. He was designated for assignment by the Dodgers on July 1, cleared waivers, and was outrighted to the AAA Oklahoma City Dodgers on July 3. He got into six games for Oklahoma City and was 0–2 with a 20.65 ERA before spending most of the season on the disabled list. The Dodgers assigned him to the Double-A Tulsa Drillers of the Texas League to start the 2017 season. He split the season between Tulsa and Oklahoma City, appearing in 39 games with a 7–1 record and 2.21 ERA. In 2018, Somsen pitched in 11 games for Tulsa, allowing only one earned run in 12 innings.

References

External links

1989 births
Living people
People from Yankton, South Dakota
Baseball players from South Dakota
Major League Baseball pitchers
Cincinnati Reds players
South Dakota State Jackrabbits baseball players
Billings Mustangs players
Dayton Dragons players
Bakersfield Blaze players
Pensacola Blue Wahoos players
Louisville Bats players
Peoria Javelinas players
Scranton/Wilkes-Barre RailRiders players
Oklahoma City Dodgers players
Tulsa Drillers players